Truly for You is a 1984 album by American R&B vocal group the Temptations. Released on October 15, 1984 by Motown Records' Gordy label, This is the first full Temptations album to feature Ali-Ollie Woodson (credited simply as "Ollie Woodson"); who joined the group in 1984 to replace Dennis Edwards.  The album was produced by Al McKay and Ralph Johnson of Earth, Wind & Fire. Included on the album are the R&B hit singles "Treat Her Like a Lady", "My Love Is True (Truly For You)", and "How Can You Say That It's Over".

Track listing
Superscripts denote lead singers for each track: (a) Ali-Ollie Woodson, (b) Ron Tyson, (c) Richard Street, (d) Melvin Franklin, (e) Otis Williams.
All selections produced, arranged, and conducted by Al McKay and Ralph Johnson.

Side one 
"Running" (Phillip Ingram, Zane Giles, Tony Haynes) – 3:28 a
"Treat Her Like a Lady" (Otis Williams, Ali-Ollie Woodson) – 4:40 a
"How Can You Say That It's Over" (Tom Keane, Mike Himelstein) – 6:05 b, a
"My Love is True (Truly for You)" (Otis Williams, Ron Tyson, Victor Carstarphen) – 6:08 b, e

Side two 
"Memories" (Don Freeman, David Batteau) – 4:39 a
"Just to Keep You in My Life" (William Durham, Lorrin Bates) – 4:23 b
"Set Your Love Right" (Ron Tyson, Victor Carstarphen) – 5:09 a
"I'll Keep My Light in My Window" (Terri McFaddin, Leonard Caston) – 4:30 c

Personnel 
Performers
Melvin Franklin - vocals (bass)
Richard Street - vocals (tenor)
Ron Tyson - vocals (tenor/falsetto)
Otis Williams - vocals (baritone)
Ali-Ollie Woodson - vocals (Tenor), synthesizers and programming

Musicians
Michael Boddicker, Victor Carstarphen, Ronnie Foster - synthesizers and programming
Robbie Buchanan, Randy Kerber, Jerry Peters - keyboards
Paulinho da Costa, Ralph Johnson - percussion
Dean Gant - keyboards, synthesizers and programming, Moog bass synthesizer
Zane Giles, Johnny Graham, Paul M. Jackson, Jr., Al McKay - guitar
Ed Greene - drums
Phillip Ingram - Moog bass synthesizer
James Jamerson, Jr. - bass guitar
Fred Johnson - DMX drum programming

Charts

Album

Singles

References

External links 
 Truly for You at Discogs
 Truly for You at Rate Your Music

1984 albums
The Temptations albums
Gordy Records albums